Rajsamand is one of the 200 Legislative Assembly constituencies of Rajasthan state in India. It is in Rajsamand district and is a part of Rajsamand Lok Sabha Constituency.

Member of Legislative Assembly

Election Results

2021 Bye election

2018 Vidhan Sabha

2013

See also
List of constituencies of the Rajasthan Legislative Assembly
Rajsamand district

References

Assembly constituencies of Rajasthan
Rajsamand district